Mochi Pura (Punjabi) is a locality located within union council 128 (Faisal Town) in Gulberg Tehsil of Lahore, Punjab, Pakistan. It has a population of about 10,000 people. More than half of them are not permanent citizens of Lahore, i.e., students living in rented rooms or families working in nearby wealthy areas like Model Town and Faisal Town.

Location 
Mochi Pura is situated between Township, Faisal Town, Johar Town, Model Town and  Model Town Link Road. It is part of Union Council 128 of the Lahore City District.

Living conditions 
As typical with the third world city's downtown, most of the living necessities are below standard in Mochi Pura.  Although it is densely populated, it has an insufficient sewerage system, water supply system and power supply system.

Important days 
Once in a year, Urs/Mela at the local Mizar related to Baba Dulla is celebrated with great enthusiasm.  Participation of children in the mela is worth looking.  However, Charas and Bhang is consumed in large quantities at the occasion.  Higher authorities might have some other more important issues to resolve.

Mosques 
There are four important mosques in Mochi Pura namely Masjid Noor, Madina Masjid, Rehman Masjid and a small but beautiful Ma'raj Masjid.

References

Gulberg, Lahore